The 1979 DFB-Pokal Final decided the winner of the 1978–79 DFB-Pokal, the 36th season of Germany's knockout football cup competition. It was played on 23 June 1979 at the Niedersachsenstadion in Hanover. Fortuna Düsseldorf won the match 1–0 against Hertha BSC after extra time, to claim their 1st cup title.

Route to the final
The DFB-Pokal began with 128 teams in a single-elimination knockout cup competition. There were a total of six rounds leading up to the final. Teams were drawn against each other, and the winner after 90 minutes would advance. If still tied, 30 minutes of extra time was played. If the score was still level, a replay would take place at the original away team's stadium. If still level after 90 minutes, 30 minutes of extra time was played. If the score was still level, a penalty shoot-out was used to determine the winner.

Note: In all results below, the score of the finalist is given first (H: home; A: away).

Match

Details

References

External links
 Match report at kicker.de 
 Match report at WorldFootball.net
 Match report at Fussballdaten.de 

Hertha BSC matches
Fortuna Düsseldorf matches
1978–79 in German football cups
1979
Sports competitions in Hanover
20th century in Hanover
June 1979 sports events in Europe